This is a list of Superfund sites in Guam designated under the Comprehensive Environmental Response, Compensation and Liability Act (CERCLA) environmental law:

See also
List of Superfund sites in the United States
List of environmental issues
List of waste types
TOXMAP

References

External links
EPA list of current Superfund sites in Guam
EPA list of deleted Superfund sites in Guam

Guam
Superfund sites
Superfund